The Second Barr Ministry was the 14th ministry of the Government of the Australian Capital Territory, led by Labor Chief Minister Andrew Barr and his deputy Yvette Berry. It was appointed on 1 November 2016, following the 2016 general election held two weeks earlier. The Greens signed a new formal Parliamentary Agreement with Labor which continued to maintain Green's leader Shane Rattenbury's position in the Ministry, whilst mandating that the Greens not move or support any motion of no confidence in the Labor Government, except in instances of gross misconduct or corruption.

The previous First Barr Ministry initially contained five ministers, but was later increased to seven ministers. The number was not increased in the second ministry after the 2016 general election, even when eight more members were elected to form an expanded 25 member Legislative Assembly. The ministry was subsequently increased to eight ministers in August 2018.

The ministry was replaced by the Third Barr Ministry on 3 November 2020 after the Labor government's re-election at the 2020 election.

First Arrangement
Following Labor's re-election at the 2016 general election, a new ministry was appointed on 1 November 2016. Gordon Ramsay and Rachel Stephen-Smith were new ministers appointed to the ministry, replacing Simon Corbell who retired and Chris Bourke who was defeated at the 2016 election.

Subsequent changes to ministerial titles
There are two changes to ministerial titles between November 2016 and August 2018:
19 December 2016: Minister for Justice and Consumer Affairs was renamed Minister for Justice, Consumer Affairs and Road Safety (held by Shane Rattenbury)
1 July 2017: Minister for Health was renamed Minister for Health and Wellbeing (held by Meegan Fitzharris)

Second Arrangement
On 27 August 2018, Chris Steel was appointed to the Ministry, increasing the Ministry size to 8.

Fitzharris resignation
On 24 June 2019, Meegan Fitzharris announced she would resign from her cabinet roles (Transport, Health and Tertiary Education) on 1 July and politics for family reasons. In the interim until an additional new minister is appointed to the Ministry, Chris Steel took on the transport portfolio as the Transport Minister, Rachel Stephen-Smith took on the health portfolio as the Health Minister and Chief Minister Andrew Barr took on the tertiary education portfolio, all with effect from 27 June 2019. Gordon Ramsay took over as Minister for Government Services and Procurement from Stephen-Smith. There is no replacement for the Minister for Vocational Education and Skills.

The following only includes ministers whose portfolios have changed on 27 June 2019. The interim arrangement lasted till 25 August 2019.

Third Arrangement
Following the interim arrangement as a result of the resignation of Meegan Fitzharris from the Ministry, a new arrangement was formed on 26 August 2019 with Suzanne Orr appointed to the Ministry.

March 2020 reshuffle
A minor reshuffle was made to the ministerial portfolios on 23 March 2020. The Tertiary Education portfolio was passed from Barr to Chris Steel and the Urban Renewal portfolio was passed from Rachel Stephen-Smith to Mick Gentleman. The arrangement lasted until the October 2020 election.

The following only includes ministers whose portfolios have changed on 23 March 2020.

References

Australian Capital Territory ministries
Australian Labor Party ministries in the Australian Capital Territory